Aseana College is a college in Kota Kinabalu, Sabah, Malaysia. Founded in 2008, the college provide courses on medical sciences. It is located on two campuses, with the main and administrative centre located in Sembulan, while the second campus is located kilometres away from the main campus.

Courses 
The college provide diploma certificates in:
 Diploma in Nursing studies
 Foundation in Science
 Certificate in English language
 Diploma in Business administration
 GCE A Level
 Diploma in Health administration
 Diploma in Occupational Safety and Health (OSHA)

References

 

Colleges in Malaysia
Buildings and structures in Kota Kinabalu
Universities and colleges in Sabah
Educational institutions established in 2008
2008 establishments in Malaysia
Cambridge schools in Malaysia